The or Es with Descender (Ҫ ҫ; italics: Ҫ ҫ) is a letter of the Cyrillic script. In Unicode, this letter is called "Es with descender". In Chuvash, it looks identical to the Latin letter C with cedilla (Ç ç Ç ç). Occasionally it also has the hook diacritic curved rightward like an ogonek, as in the SVG image shown in the sidebar. In many fonts, the character hooks to the left.

The is used in the alphabets of the Bashkir and Chuvash languages.
 In Bashkir it represents the voiceless dental fricative .
 In Chuvash it represents the voiceless alveolo-palatal fricative .

It is usually romanized as 'ś', 'θ', or 'þ'.

Computing codes

See also
С с : Cyrillic letter Es
Ѳ ѳ : Cyrillic letter Fita, pronounced in Russian as "Ф" , which replaced it in the 1918 alphabet reform, and derived from the Greek letter theta, classically pronounced as a voiceless dental fricative [], but sounding like [] in Byzantine Greek, which influenced East Slavic languages the most
Cyrillic characters in Unicode

References